Castle Rock is an unincorporated community on the west bank of the Fraser River between the cities of Williams Lake and Quesnel, British Columbia, Canada, located in that province's Cariboo Country opposite the community of Margeruite and near Alexandria.  Castle Rock is named for a rock outcrop of the same name on the Fraser River in that area.

References
BCGNIS entry "Castle Rock (community)"

Unincorporated settlements in British Columbia
Fraser River
Geography of the Cariboo
Populated places in the Cariboo Regional District